These are the Billboard magazine R&B albums that reached number one in 1985.

Chart history

See also
1985 in music
R&B number-one hits of 1985 (USA)

1985
1985 record charts